Graham Kelly (born 16 October 1997) is an Irish professional footballer who plays as a centre-back for NIFL Premiership side Larne. He has represented the Republic of Ireland at under-18 and under-19 level.

He began his career at Sheffield United, where he made his senior debut in April 2016. He played on loan at Stalybridge Celtic later in the year, before he was transferred to Port Vale in June 2017. He played on loan at Bradford Park Avenue and Southport during the 2017–18 season. He joined Northern Irish side Larne in August 2018 and helped the club to win the NIFL Championship title in 2018–19 and the County Antrim Shield in the 2020–21 season. They retained the County Antrim Shield the following two seasons.

Club career

Sheffield United
Kelly came through the Academy at Sheffield United to make his senior debut for the "Blades" as a late substitute for Matt Done in a 3–1 defeat to Coventry City at the Ricoh Arena on 30 April 2016. He joined Stalybridge Celtic of the National League North on loan in August 2016. He made ten appearances for the "Celts" over a five-week stay at Bower Fold.

Port Vale
Kelly signed a one-year contract, with the option for a second year, at newly relegated EFL League Two club Port Vale in June 2017. He said he was looking forward to working with manager Michael Brown and being reunited with former Sheffield United coach Chris Morgan. On 8 September 2017, he joined National League North side Bradford Park Avenue on a one-month loan after manager Mark Bower needed cover for the injured Shane Killock, Matt Hill and Luca Havern. He scored his first goal in senior football in his final appearance for Avenue, after combining well with Oli Johnson in a 2–0 win over Brackley Town at the Horsfall Stadium. On 26 January 2018, he joined Kevin Davies's National League North side Southport on loan until the end of the 2017–18 season. He recovered from a car accident on the M6 motorway to make a total of 11 appearances for the "Sandgrounders". Upon his return to Vale Park he was informed by manager Neil Aspin that he would not be retained beyond the summer.

Larne
On 2 August 2018, Kelly joined NIFL Championship side Larne. He established himself in the side as a left-sided centre back in the club's favoured three at the back formation, as Larne went on to win the 2018–19 NIFL Championship. He made 27 appearances before the 2019–20 season was ended early due to the COVID-19 pandemic in Northern Ireland. On 2 December 2020, he played in the County Antrim Shield as Larne held Glentoran to a 0–0 draw and then won the resulting penalty shoot-out 4–3 to win the club its first major trophy in 33 years. He scored his first goal for the club on 11 December, "a stunning curler into the top corner" in a 3–1 win over Linfield at Inver Park. He made 20 appearances in the 2020–21 campaign, helping Larne to finish in a UEFA Europa Conference League qualification place. He signed a contract extension to keep him at the club until 2023. Larne retained their County Antrim Shield title with a 1–0 win over Linfield. He played 30 games in the 2021–22 season, including the 4–2 win over Glentoran at The Oval in the final of the UEFA Europa Conference League play-offs. A third successive County Antrim Shield title was secured with a penalty shoot-out victory over Linfield.

International career
Kelly won four caps at for the Republic of Ireland at both under-18 and under-19 level, and scored for the under-19s against Latvia in November 2015.

Career statistics

Honours
Larne
NIFL Championship: 2018–19
County Antrim Shield (3): 2020–21, 2021–22, 2022–23

References

1997 births
Living people
Association footballers from Dublin (city)
Republic of Ireland association footballers
Republic of Ireland youth international footballers
Association football defenders
Association football fullbacks
Sheffield United F.C. players
Stalybridge Celtic F.C. players
Port Vale F.C. players
Bradford (Park Avenue) A.F.C. players
Southport F.C. players
Larne F.C. players
English Football League players
National League (English football) players